{{DISPLAYTITLE:C10H11NO}}
The molecular formula C10H11NO (molar mass: 161.20 g/mol, exact mass: 161.084064 u) may refer to:

 Tryptophol
 Abikoviromycin

Molecular formulas